Lisuart und Dariolette, oder Die Frage und die Antwort (Lisuart and Dariolette, or The Question and the Answer) is a 'romantisch-comische Oper' by the German composer Johann Adam Hiller.

The libretto was by Daniel Schiebeler based on La fée Urgèle ou Ce qui plaît aux dames by Charles Simon Favart, itself derived from The Wife of Bath's Tale by Geoffrey Chaucer.

Performance history
The opera was first performed in a two-act version at the Rannstädtertor Theater, Leipzig on 25 November 1766, conducted by the composer. A revised version in three acts was produced on 7 January 1767.

Roles

Synopsis
Queen Ginevra of England sends the knight Lisuart to find her lost daughter Dariolette. In the course of his mission, Lisuart has to answer the riddle: "What gives women the most pleasure?"

References

Further reading
Bauman, Thomas (1992), "Lisuart und Dariolette" in The New Grove Dictionary of Opera, ed. Stanley Sadie (London)

External links

German-language operas
1766 operas
Operas by Johann Adam Hiller
Operas
Operas based on literature
Works based on The Canterbury Tales